Anyphops rubicundus is a species of flattie spider in the Selenopidae family, within the genus Anyphops.

Though initially classified by South African arachnologist Reginald Frederick Lawrence as part of the gens Selenops  in 1940, it was later transferred to the genus Anyphops by Belgian arachnologist Pierre L.G. Benoit in 1968.

Distribution
This species is endemic to South Africa, and is found in the Mpumalanga, Limpopo and Western Cape provinces.

Original publication (description of the spider)
 Lawrence, 1940 : The genus Selenops (Araneae) in South Africa. Annals of the South African Museum,  (text).
The species was classified as a Selenops in this publication.

References

Selenopidae
Spiders of South Africa
Spiders described in 1940